Alexander Cooper (born 12 July 1942) is a sailor from Bermuda. Cooper represented his country at the 1972 Summer Olympics in Kiel. Cooper took 15th place in the Soling with Kirkland Cooper as helmsman and Jordy Walker as fellow crew member.

References

Living people
1942 births
Bermudian male sailors (sport)
Sailors at the 1972 Summer Olympics – Soling
Olympic sailors of Bermuda